Canopo has been borne by at least three ships of the Italian Navy and may refer to:

 , a  launched in 1907 and discarded in 1923.
 , a  launched in 1936 and sunk in 1941.
 , a  launched in 1955 and discarded in 1982. 

Italian Navy ship names